Map of places in Conwy County Borough compiled from this list
See the list of places in Wales for places in other principal areas.

This is a list of towns and villages in Conwy County Borough, Wales.

 

A
Abergele

B
Betws-y-Coed
Betws yn Rhos
Bodelwyddan

C
Capel Curig
Capel Garmon 
Cefn Brith   
Cerrig-y-drudion
Colwyn Bay
Conwy

D
Deganwy
Dolgarrog
Dolwyddelan
Dwygyfylchi

E
Eglwysbach

G
Glan Conwy
Glasfryn
Gwytherin

K
Kinmel Bay

L
Llanbedr-y-Cennin
Llanddoged
Llanddulas
Llandudno 
Llandudno Junction
Llanfairfechan
Llanfair Talhaiarn
Llangernyw
Llanrhychwyn
Llanrwst
Llysfaen

M
Melin-y-Coed
Mochdre

O
Old Colwyn

P
Pandy Tudur
Penmachno
Penmaenmawr
Penrhyn Bay
Pentrefoelas

R
Rhos-on-Sea
Rowen

T
Tal-y-bont
Tal-y-Cafn
Trefriw
Ty'n-y-Groes
Towyn

Y
Ysbyty Ifan

See also
List of places in Conwy county borough (categorised)

Conwy